Thường Tín is a township and capital of Thường Tín District, Hanoi, Vietnam.

References

Populated places in Hanoi
District capitals in Vietnam
Townships in Vietnam